Midrash Al Yithallel (Hebrew: מדרש אל יתהלל) is a small midrash containing stories from the lives of the wise Solomon, the mighty David, and the rich Korah, illustrating Jeremiah 9:23, whence comes the title:

The text has been published according to a manuscript at Munich by A. Jellinek, and according to a manuscript from Yemen by Grünhut, with valuable references to sources and parallels. With the story of Solomon may be compared the passage cited in Jellinek; the history of David is similar to the midrash of Goliath; and that of Korach to the passage in the Midrash Tehillim.

References

Jewish Encyclopedia bibliography 
A. Jellinek, B. H. iv., p. xiii.; vi., pp. xxvi. et seq.

Smaller midrashim